Tomas Hoszek (born 10 June 1960) is a Swedish volleyball player. He competed in the men's tournament at the 1988 Summer Olympics.

In late July 2019, he was appointed secretary general for Elite Football Women.

References

External links
 

1960 births
Living people
Swedish men's volleyball players
Olympic volleyball players of Sweden
Volleyball players at the 1988 Summer Olympics
Sportspeople from Stockholm